This is a list of patron saints of occupations and activities, it also encompasses groups of people with a common occupation or activity.

A
Academics - Thomas Aquinas
Actors - Genesius
Comic actors - Maturinus
Accountants - Matthew
Advertisers - Bernard of Clairvaux, Bernardine of Siena
Air travellers - Joseph of Cupertino
Altar servers - John Berchmans, Stephen, Tarcisius, Lorenzo Ruiz
Ambassadors - Gabriel the Archangel
Anesthesiologists - René Goupil
Animal rights activists - Francis of Assisi
Apprentices - John Bosco
Archeologists - Helen of Constantinople 
Archers - George, Nicholas of Myra, Ursula
Archivists - Lawrence
Architects - Barbara, Benedict of Nursia, Bernward of Hildesheim, Thomas the Apostle
Armourers - George
Arms dealers - Adrian of Nicomedia
Art dealers - John the Evangelist
Artillerymen - Barbara
Artists - Luke the Evangelist, Philip Neri, Eligius
Animals - Saint Francis of Assisi
Astronauts - Joseph of Cupertino
Astronomers - Dominic
Athletes - Sebastian, Christopher
Attorneys - Genesius
Authors - Francis de Sales, John the Evangelist, Lucy
Aviators - Joseph of Cupertino, Our Lady of Loreto, Thérèse of Lisieux (The Little Flower)

B

Bakers - Agatha of Sicily, Elisabeth of Hungary, Honorius of Amiens, Peter the Apostle
Bakers of altar bread - Honorius of Amiens
Bankers - Bernardine of Feltre, Matthew
Barbers - Cosmas, Damian
Barristers - Genesius
Bartenders - Amand
Basket makers - Anthony the Abbot, Anne – miners,
Beekeepers - Ambrose of Milan, Bernard of Clairvaux, Valentine
Beggars - Ambrose of Milan, Elisabeth of Hungary, Giles
Bell makers - Agatha of Sicily
Belt makers - Alexius of Rome, Theobald of Provins
Bird dealers - John the Baptist
Blacksmiths - Dunstan, Peter the Apostle
Boatmen - Julian the Hospitaller
Bookbinders - Christopher, Pope Celestine V
Bookkeepers - Matthew
Booksellers - John of God
Bombardiers - Quentin
Box makers - Fiacre
Boy Scouts - George
Brewers - Amand, Arnold of Soissons, Augustine of Hippo, Dorothea of Caesarea, Nicholas of Myra
Bridge builders - Bénézet, Peter the Apostle
Bricklayers - Stephen
Broadcasters - Gabriel the Archangel 
Brush makers - Anthony of Padua
Builders - Barbara, Vincent Ferrer
 Businessmen - Homobonus
Butchers - Adrian of Nicomedia, Andrew the Apostle, Anthony the Abbot, George, Peter the Apostle

C

Cabinet makers - Andrew the Apostle, Joseph
Candle makers - Ambrose of Milan
Canon lawyers - Raymond of Penyafort
Carpenters - Joseph, Matthias, Peter the Apostle
Casket makers - Stephen
Cattlemen - Andrew the Apostle
Catechists - Charles Borromeo, Robert Bellarmine
Catholic students - Aloysius Gonzaga
Cavalry - George
Chandlers - Ambrose of Milan, Bernard of Clairvaux
Chaplains - Quentin
Charcoal burners - Alexander of Comana, Theobald of Provins
Chefs - Francis Caracciolo, Lawrence
Pastry chefs - Honorius of Amiens, Philip
Chess players - Teresa of Ávila
Children - Nicholas
Chimney sweeps - Erasmus of Formiae, Florian
Cinema - Genesius
Civil engineers - Dominic de la Calzada
Civil servants - Thomas More
Clergy of Korea - Andrew Kim
Clerics - Gabriel of Our Lady of Sorrows
Clock makers - Peter the Apostle
Clothworkers - Homobonus, Peter the Apostle
Clowns - Genesius, Maturinus
Cobblers - Crispin
Coffee house owners - Drogo of Sebourg
Comedians - Genesius, Lawrence , Philip Neri, Vitus
Communications workers - Gabriel the Archangel
Computer programmers - Isidore of Seville
Computer scientists - Isidore of Seville
Computer technicians - Isidore of Seville
Computer users - Isidore of Seville
Confectioners - Honorius of Amiens
Cooks - Lawrence, Martha 
Coopers - Urban of Langres
Couriers - Bona of Pisa
Court clerks - Thomas More
Craftsmen - Joseph, Macarius of Unzha, Eligius
Cream clotters - Piran
Crusaders - George
Curriers - Bartholomew the Apostle, Crispin
Customs agents - Matthew
Cutlers - Lucy
Cyclists - Sebastian

D

Dairy workers - Brigid of Ireland
Dancers - Vitus
Deacons - Stephen, Marinus
Dentists - Antipas, Apollonia, Foillan
Dietitians - Martha 
Diplomats - Gabriel the Archangel 
Doctors - Cosmas, Damian, Luke the Evangelist, Pantaleon, Raphael the Archangel,Gianna_Beretta_Molla
Domestic servants - Zita
Drapers - Severus of Avranches
Drivers - Christopher, Fiacre, Frances of Rome
Dyers - Maurice and Lydia

E

Ecologists - Francis of Assisi, Kateri 
Editors - John Bosco, John the Evangelist
Educators - Ignatius of Loyola, John Baptist de la Salle, Marcellin Champagnat, Scholastica
Embroiderers - Clare of Assisi, Rose of Lima
Emergency dispatchers - Gabriel the Archangel 
Engineers - Benedict of Nursia, Ferdinand III, Patrick
Military engineers - Barbara
English writers - Bede
Environmentalists - Kateri 
Equestrians - Andrew the Apostle, George, James (son of Zebedee)
Exorcists - Anastasia of Sirmium

F

Farmers - Benedict of Nursia, Bernard of Vienne, Botolph, Eligius, Isidore the Farmer, Notburga, Phocas the Gardener, Theobald of Provins, Walstan
Farm workers - Andrew the Apostle, Benedict of Nursia, Bernard of Vienne, Eligius, George, Isidore the Farmer, Notburga, Phocas the Gardener, Walstan
Farriers - Eligius, John the Baptist
Field workers - Medard
Firefighters - Eustace, Florian
Brazilian firefighters - George
Military firefighters - Barbara
Fireworks makers - Barbara
Fishermen - Andrew the Apostle, Benno, Our Lady of Salambao, Peter the Apostle, Zeno of Verona
Fishmongers - Andrew the Apostle, Magnus of Avignon, Peter the Apostle
Flight attendants - Bona of Pisa
Florists - Dorothea of Caesarea, Fiacre, Honorius of Amiens, Thérèse of Lisieux (The Little Flower)
Flour merchants - Honorius of Amiens
Foresters - John Gualbert
Foundry workers - Barbara
Fullers - Anastasius the Fuller
Funeral directors - Joseph of Arimathea
Furriers - Hubertus, James (son of Zebedee)

G

Gamblers - Cajetan
Gardeners - Ansovinus, Christopher, Fiacre, Phocas the Gardener, Rose of Lima, Urban of Langres
Geoscientists - Barbara
Glass makers - Peter the Apostle
Glaziers - Lucy
Gilders - Clare of Assisi
Goldsmiths - Clare of Assisi, Dunstan, Eligius
Grave diggers - Anthony the Abbot, Roch
Guards - Adrian of Nicomedia, Peter of Alcantara
Guides - Bona of Pisa

H

Hairdressers - Mary Magdalene
Harness makers - Eligius
Harvesters - Peter the Apostle
Hat makers - Severus of Avranches
Healers - Anastasia of Sirmium, Brigid of Ireland
Heralds - Benedict of Nursia
Herbalists - Fiacre
Historians - Bede, Isidore of Seville 
The homeless - Peter of Saint Joseph de Betancur, Thérèse of Lisieux
Homemakers - Andrew the Apostle
Horsemen - George
Horticulture - Dorothea of Caesarea, Fiacre
Hosiers - Fiacre
Hospital administrators - Basil the Great, Frances Xavier Cabrini
Hospital public relations - Paul the Apostle
Hospital workers - Camillus of Lellis, John of God, Jude
Husbandry - Benedict of Nursia, Bernard of Vienne, Eligius, George, Isidore the Farmer, Phocas the Gardener, Walstan
Hunters - Eustace, Hubertus

I

Ice skaters - Lidwina
Immigrants - Frances Xavier Cabrini
Infantrymen - Maurice
Innkeepers - Amand

J

Jesters - Maturinus
Jesuit scholastics - Aloysius Gonzaga
Jewelers - Eligius
Job seekers - Cajetan
Joiners - Matthew
Journalists - Francis de Sales
Jurors - Catherine of Siena
Jurists - John of Capistrano

K

Kings - Edward the Confessor 
Knights - George 
Knights Hospitaller - John the Almoner, John the Baptist

L

Laborers - Joseph, Lucy
Lace workers - Teresa of Ávila
Land surveyors - Thomas the Apostle
Laundry workers - Clare of Assisi, Hunna, Veronica
Lawyers - Genesius, Thomas More, Yves
Leatherworkers - Bartholomew the Apostle, Crispin
Librarians - Catherine of Alexandria, Jerome, Lawrence
Lighthouse keepers - Verena
Linguists - Gottschalk
Locksmiths - Dunstan, Quentin
Lumberjacks - Gummarus

M

Marble workers - Clement
Marines
Italian marines - Barbara
Manual laborers - Isidore the Farmer
Makers of images of the crucifix - John of Damascus
Mariners - Brendan the Navigator, Christopher, Clement, Nicholas of Tolentine
Martyrs - Anastasia of Sirmium, Lucy
Matchmakers - Raphael the Archangel
Mathematicians - Barbara
Mechanics - Catherine of Alexandria, Eligius
Medical record librarians - Raymond of Penyafort
Medical social workers - John Regis
Medical technicians - Albertus Magnus
Mental health professionals - Dymphna
Merchants - Amand, Francis of Assisi, Macarius of Unzha, Nicholas of Myra
Messengers - Gabriel the Archangel
Metal workers - Eligius
Meteorologists - Medard
Midwives - Pantaleon, Raymond Nonnatus
Millers - Arnulph, Christina the Astonishing, Leodegar, Winnoc
Miners - Barbara 
Missionaries - Francis Xavier, Mother Teresa of Calcutta, Thérèse of Lisieux ( The Little Flower )
Motorcyclists - Columbanus
Motorists - Anthony the Abbot 
Mountaineers - Bernard of Menthon
Musicians - Cecilia, Dunstan

N

Natural scientists - Albertus Magnus
Navigators - Brendan the Navigator
Nomadic travelers - Anthony of Padua
Numismatists - Eligius
Notaries - Luke the Evangelist
Nuns - Brigid of Ireland
Benedictine nuns - Scholastica
Nurses - Agatha of Sicily, Alexius of Rome, Camillus of Lellis, Catherine of Alexandria, John of God, Margaret of Antioch, Raphael the Archangel
Children's nurses - Foillan
Nursing services - Elisabeth of Hungary
Italian nurses - Catherine of Siena
Nurse anesthetists - René Goupil
Nursing mothers - Basilissa

O

Obstetricians - Raymond Nonnatus
Odd lot dealers - Cajetan
Officers at arms - Benedict of Nursia
Oil refiners - Honorius of Amiens
Orphans - Gerolamo Emiliani , Thérèse of Lisieux, Ursula
Overseas workers - Lorenzo Ruiz

P

Painters - Luke the Evangelist
Papal delegates - Pope John XXIII
Paramedics - Michael the Archangel
Paralegals - Patrick
Paratroopers - Michael the Archangel
Parish clerks - Cassian of Imola
Pasty makers - Piran
Pawnbrokers - Bernardine of Feltre, Nicholas of Myra
Peasants - Lucy
Perfumers - Matthew
Pewterers - Fiacre
Pharmacists - Cosmas, Damian, Gemma Galgani, James (son of Alphaeus), James (son of Zebedee), Mary Magdalene, Raphael the Archangel
Philosophers - Albertus Magnus, Boethius, Catherine of Alexandria
Photographers - Veronica
Physicists - Rebekah
Pig keepers - Anthony the Abbot, Malo
Pilgrims - Bona of Pisa, James (son of Zebedee)
Pilots - Christopher
Plasterers - Bartholomew the Apostle
Plowboys - Fiacre
Plumbers - Maturinus
Poets - John Henry Newman
Police dispatchers - Gabriel the Archangel
Police officers - Jude, Michael the Archangel
Brazilian police officers - George
Politicians - Thomas the Apostle, Thomas More, Marinus
Poor students - Joseph of Cupertino
Popes - Peter the Apostle
Porters - Quentin
Postal workers - Gabriel the Archangel
Potters - Justa and Rufina, Peter the Apostle
Preachers - Catherine of Alexandria
Pregnant women - Gerard Majella
Priests - John Vianney
Diocesan priests - Thomas Becket
Princes - Gottschalk
Printers - Augustine of Hippo, John Bosco
Prison officers
Italian prison officers - Basilides
Psychiatrists - Christina the Astonishing, Dymphna
Publishers - John Bosco
Pyrotechnicians - Erasmus of Formiae

Q

Queens - Jadwiga of Poland

R

Radio workers - Gabriel the Archangel 
Radiologists - Gabriel the Archangel
Royal Electrical Mechanical Engineers soldiers - Eligius

S
Saddle makers - Crispin, George
Saddlers - Lucy
Sailors - Botolph, Brendan the Navigator, Elizabeth Seton, Erasmus of Formiae, Nicholas of Myra, Peter the Apostle, Phocas the Gardener
Sailors in Brittany - Maturinus
French Canadian voyagers and sailors - Andrew the Apostle
Salespeople - Lucy
Scholars - Brigid of Ireland
School children - Isidore of Seville, Madeleine Sophie Barat
School teachers - Cassian of Imola
Scientists - Albertus Magnus, Dominic
Scribes - Catherine of Alexandria
Sculptors - Claude
Seafarers - Brendan the Navigator
Second hand dealers - Roch 
Secretaries - Catherine of Alexandria, Claude
Security guards - Matthew, Michael the Archangel
Seminarians - Charles Borromeo, Gabriel of Our Lady of Sorrows
Service men of the Russian Strategic Rocket Forces - Barbara
Servers the sick - Saint Peter of Saint Joseph de Betancur
Shepherds - Bernadette of Lourdes, Cuthbert, Cuthman, Dominic of Silos, Drogo of Sebourg, George, Germaine Cousin, Julian the Hospitaller, Raphael the Archangel, Regina, Solange
Shoemakers - Crispin, Gangulphus, Peter the Apostle, Theobald of Provins
Shorthand writers - Cassian of Imola
Skiers - Bernard of Menthon
Silk makers - Severus of Avranches
Software engineers - Isidore of Seville
Soldiers - Adrian of Nicomedia, George, Ignatius of Loyola, Joan of Arc, Martin of Tours, Michael the Archangel, Sebastian, Theodore
Special forces - Philip Neri
Spectacle makers - Jerome
Speleologists
Italian speleologists - Benedict of Nursia
Spiritual directors - Ephrem the Syrian
Spur makers - Giles
Stablemen - Andrew the Apostle
Stained glass workers - Lucy
Statesmen - Thomas More
Steeplejacks - Erasmus of Formiae
Stenographers - Cassian of Imola, Catherine of Alexandria
Stonecutters - Clement
Stonemasons - Barbara, Blaise,  Reinold, Marinus
Students - Albertus Magnus, Benedict of Nursia, Catherine of Alexandria, Gabriel of Our Lady of Sorrows, Gemma Galgani, Isidore of Seville, Lawrence, Tatiana of Rome, Thomas Aquinas, Ursula, Wolbodo
Students in various European cities - Nicholas of Myra
Surfers - Christopher
Surgeons - Cosmas, Damian, Foillan, Luke the Evangelist, Quentin, Roch

T

Tailors - Homobonus, Matthias, Quentin
Tanners - Bartholomew the Apostle, Catherine of Alexandria, Clement, Crispin, Gangulphus, James (son of Zebedee), John the Apostle, John the Evangelist, Lawrence, Mary Magdalene, Simon
Tax collectors - Matthew
Teachers - Andrew the Apostle, Gregory the Great, Marcellin Champagnat, Thomas Aquinas
Christian teachers - John Baptist de la Salle
Television workers - Gabriel the Archangel
Test takers - Joseph of Cupertino
Teutonic Knights - George
Tin miners - Piran
Tinsmiths - Joseph of Arimathea, Piran
Tinsmiths in Paris - Maturinus
Theater performers - Clare of Assisi, Genesius
Thieves who repent - Nicholas of Myra
Theologians - Augustine of Hippo, John the Evangelist
Therapists - Dymphna
Thomasites - Kateri 
Those seeking lost items or people - Anthony of Padua
Those who serve the sick - Peter of Saint Joseph de Betancur
Those who work at great heights - Erasmus of Formiae
Tile makers - Fiacre, Roch
Town criers - Blaise
Translators - Gottschalk, Jerome
Trappers - Bartholomew the Apostle, Eustachius
Travellers - Bona of Pisa,  Botolph, Christopher, James (son of Zebedee), Joseph, Macarius of Unzha, Raphael the Archangel
Truss makers - Foillan

U

Undertakers - Dismas
Unemployed - Cajetan

V

Veterinarians - Blaise, Eligius, James (son of Zebedee)
Vinegar makers - Vincent of Saragossa
Vine dressers - Urban of Langres
Vine growers - Amand, Urban of Langres
Vintners - Amand, Urban of Langres
Volunteers - Vincent de Paul

W

Waiters - Zita
Washer women - Hunna
Wax melters and refiners - Ambrose of Milan, Bernard of Clairvaux
Weavers - Anastasia of Sirmium, Anthony Mary Claret
Wheelwrights - Catherine of Alexandria
Wine growers - Theobald of Provins
Wine makers - Vincent of Saragossa
Working people - Joseph
Women seeking a husband - Anthony of Padua
Wood carvers - Wolfgang of Regensburg
Wood workers - Wolfgang of Regensburg
Wool combers and weavers - Blaise
Wool makers - Severus of Avranches
Writers - Francis de Sales, Philip Neri, Teresa of Ávila

X

Y

Z
Zoology - Albertus Magnus, Francis of Assisi

See also 

 Patron saints of ailments, illness, and dangers
 Patron saints of places
 Patronage of the Blessed Virgin Mary
 Saint symbolism

References 

patron saints by occupation and activity